Fatoumata Diarra may refer to:

Fatoumata Dembélé Diarra (born 1949), Malian lawyer and judge
Fatoumata Diarra (footballer) (born 1986), Malian footballer